HDFC may refer to:
 Housing Development Finance Corporation, an Indian mortgage company
 HDFC Bank, an Indian financial services company
 HDFC Life, a joint venture of Housing Development Finance Corporation and Standard Life plc
 HDFC Bank of Sri Lanka, a Sri Lankan specialised housing bank
 Housing Development Fund Corporation, a special type of limited equity housing cooperative in New York City